The Taizhou dialect (Taizhou dialect: T'e-tsiu wa) is a dialect of Wu Chinese. It is spoken in the city of Taizhou in Zhejiang province, China. It is only partially intelligible with Shanghainese.

Phonetics

Consonants

[m] and [ŋ] are syllabic consonants

Vowels

References 

Wu Chinese
Taizhou, Zhejiang